Sergei Valeryevich Kulichenko (born 3 February 1978) is a retired Russian professional footballer.

Honours
 Russian Third League Zone 3 top scorer: 1997 (21 goals).

1978 births
Living people
Russian footballers
Russia under-21 international footballers
Russian Premier League players
Russian expatriate footballers
Expatriate footballers in Estonia
Expatriate footballers in Belgium
PFC CSKA Moscow players
FC Lantana Tallinn players
PFC Krylia Sovetov Samara players
K.V. Mechelen players
FC Lokomotiv Nizhny Novgorod players
FC Moscow players
FC Fakel Voronezh players
Association football forwards
Meistriliiga players
Russian expatriate sportspeople in Belgium
Russian expatriate sportspeople in Estonia